Sofia Tornambene (born 12 September 2002) is an Italian singer.

She is best known for winning the thirteenth season of the Italian talent show X Factor.

Biography

Early life 
Sofia Tornambene was born in 2002 in Civitanova Marche.

2019–present: X Factor Italia and career 
In February 2019 she participated at Sanremo Young and finished third.

She won the thirteenth edition of the Italian version of the X Factor in December 2019 with her single "A domani per sempre". She released her second single "Ruota panoramica" on 24 April 2020. During summer, she recorded three acoustic songs ("Tra l'asfalto e le nuvole", "Finali imprevisti", "Fiori viola") at RCA Studio Sessions.

On 10 December 2020, she launched her new single "Solo" performing live at the finale of the fourteenth edition of X Factor.

Discography

Extended plays

Singles

References

Italian pop singers
Living people
The X Factor winners
X Factor (Italian TV series) contestants
People from le Marche
21st-century Italian singers
2002 births
21st-century Italian women singers